Chilperic I (died c. 480) was the King of Burgundy from 473 until his death. He succeeded his brother Gundioch and co-ruled with his nephews Godomar, Gundobad, Chilperic II, and Godegisel.

Sources
Gregory of Tours. Historia Francorum. translated Earnest Brehaut, 1916.

Kings of the Burgundians
480 deaths
5th-century monarchs in Europe
Year of birth unknown

it:Chilperico II (re dei Burgundi)